Psykosoul  is the first studio album by R&B/neo soul singer/songwriter Sy Smith, released in 2000 on Hollywood Records. The critically acclaimed album included the singles "Gladly" and "Good N'Strong," as well as a standout cover of Edie Brickell's "What I Am" which also made an appearance on the television soundtrack of the animated series The PJ's. Psykosoul was later re-released as Psykosoul Plus.

Track listing

Psykosoul (2000) 
 Good N Strong (4:48)
 Gladly (4:07)
 That Ring (4:15)
 One (4:33)
 Deep Sleep (4:18)
 Stop Askin' (3:30)
 Broke My Heart (4:34)
 Distance (3:45)
 Can't (5:13)
 Talking to a Wall (4:22)
 Waiting... Contemplating (5:14)
 What I Am (4:34)

Psykosoul Plus (2005) 
 Deep Sleep (Axis remix)
 That Ring
 Waiting...Contemplating
 Good And Strong
 Stop Askin'
 You're the One
 Distance
 Broke My Heart
 Gladly
 Talking 2 A Wall
 Do Things (bonus track)
 What I Am
 Welcome Back (bonus track)
 Deep Sleep (original version)
 Can't

Singles

Gladly 
Track listing
 Gladly (clean)
 Gladly (clean – no rap)
 Gladly (instrumental)
 Gladly (LP version)

Good N Strong 
Track listing
 Good N Strong (radio mix)
 Good N Strong (LP version)
 Good N Strong (instrumental)

References 

2000 debut albums
Sy Smith albums